In mathematical logic, an (induced) substructure or (induced) subalgebra is a structure whose domain is a subset of that of a bigger structure, and whose functions and relations are restricted to the substructure's domain. Some examples of subalgebras are subgroups, submonoids, subrings, subfields, subalgebras of algebras over a field, or induced subgraphs. Shifting the point of view, the larger structure is called an extension or a superstructure of its substructure.

In model theory, the term "submodel" is often used as a synonym for substructure, especially when the context suggests a theory of which both structures are models.

In the presence of relations (i.e. for structures such as ordered groups or graphs, whose signature is not functional) it may make sense to relax the conditions on a subalgebra so that the relations on a weak substructure (or weak subalgebra) are at most those induced from the bigger structure. Subgraphs are an example where the distinction matters, and the term "subgraph" does indeed refer to weak substructures. Ordered groups, on the other hand, have the special property that every substructure of an ordered group which is itself an ordered group, is an induced substructure.

Definition 

Given two structures A and B of the same signature σ, A is said to be a weak substructure of B, or a weak subalgebra of B, if
 the domain of A is a subset of the domain of B,
 f A = f B|An for every n-ary function symbol f in σ, and
 R A  R B  An for every n-ary relation symbol R in σ.

A is said to be a  substructure of B, or a  subalgebra of B, if A is a weak subalgebra of B and, moreover,
 R A = R B  An for every n-ary relation symbol R in σ.

If A is a substructure of B, then B is called a superstructure of A or, especially if A is an induced substructure, an extension of A.

Example 

In the language consisting of the binary functions + and ×, binary relation <, and constants 0 and 1, the structure (Q, +, ×, <, 0, 1) is a substructure of (R, +, ×, <, 0, 1). More generally, the substructures of an ordered field (or just a field) are precisely its subfields. Similarly, in the language (×, −1, 1) of groups, the substructures of a group are its subgroups. In the language (×, 1) of monoids, however, the substructures of a group are its submonoids. They need not be groups; and even if they are groups, they need not be subgroups.

In the case of graphs (in the signature consisting of one binary relation), subgraphs, and its weak substructures are precisely its subgraphs.

As subobjects 

For every signature σ, induced substructures of σ-structures are the subobjects in the concrete category of σ-structures and strong homomorphisms (and also in the concrete category of σ-structures and σ-embeddings). Weak substructures of σ-structures are the subobjects in the concrete category of σ-structures and homomorphisms in the ordinary sense.

Submodel 

In model theory, given a structure M which is a model of a theory T, a submodel of M in a narrower sense is a substructure of M which is also a model of T. For example, if T is the theory of abelian groups in the signature (+, 0), then the submodels of the group of integers (Z, +, 0) are the substructures which are also abelian groups. Thus the natural numbers (N, +, 0) form a substructure of (Z, +, 0) which is not a submodel, while the even numbers (2Z, +, 0) form a submodel.

Other examples:
 The algebraic numbers form a submodel of the complex numbers in the theory of algebraically closed fields.
 The rational numbers form a submodel of the real numbers in the theory of fields.
 Every elementary substructure of a model of a theory T also satisfies T; hence it is a submodel.

In the category of models of a theory and embeddings between them, the submodels of a model are its subobjects.

See also 
 Elementary substructure
 End extension
 Löwenheim–Skolem theorem
 Prime model

References 

 
 
 

Mathematical logic
Model theory
Universal algebra